Rohinkhed [[Raunaqabad]] is a village in Buldhana district in the Indian state of Maharashtra. It has been of historical importance as a site of two battles, first in 1437 and second in 1590. There is a mosque. The mosque was built by Khudawand Khan, the Mahdavi, in 1582.

The old name of this village is Raunaqabad. The Jaama mosque is denoted by the Archaeological Survey of India as a cultural monument of national importance. The village is situated between the Nalganga and Utavli rivers.

Battle of Rohinkhed 1437
In 1437 Nasir Khan Faruqi, the Sultan of Khandesh, invaded Berar to avenge the ill-treatment of his daughter by Alauddin Bahamani, to whom she had been married. Khalaf Hasan Basri, the Governor of Daulatabad, who had been sent against the invader, fell upon Nasir Khan Faruqi at Rohinkhed, routed him and pursued him to his capital, Burhanpur, which he sacked.

Battle of Rohinkhed 1590
In 1590 Burhan the son of Husain Nizam Shah and the brother of Murtaza Nizam Shah of Ahmadnagar, who had taken refuge at the court of Emperor Akbar, invaded Berar in company with Raja Ali Khan, a Vassal ruler of Khandesh, to establish his claim to the kingdom of Ahmadnagar against his son Ismail Nizam Shah, who had been elevated to the throne by a faction headed by Jamalkhan. The invaders met the forces of Jamalkhan at Rohinkhed and utterly defeated them, Jamalkhan being slain and young Ismail being captured at Rohinkhed.

A mosque was built at Rohinkhed in 1582 by Khudavand Khan Mahdavi, a follower of Jamalkhan. It is now in a dilapidated condition. It bears an inscription of which only fragments are legible. It records the fact that the mosque was built in A.H. 990 (A.D. 1582) by Khudavand Khan whose generosity is praised. It is said to be second only to Kabah at Mecca in sanctity.

The area surrounding Rohinkhed was once famous as a hunting ground where different game birds and animals were found.

References

Villages in Buldhana district
Archaeological sites in Maharashtra
1590 in India
1582 in India